Granström is a Swedish last name that translates as Fir Tree (GRAN) by the Stream (STROM).

Granström may refer to:

Brita Granström (born 1969), Swedish artist and illustrator living and working in Great Britain
Holger Granström (1917–1941), professional ice hockey player who played in the SM-liiga
Jonathan Granström (born 1986), Swedish ice hockey player
Konrad Granström (1900–1982), Swedish gymnast who competed in the 1920 Summer Olympics
Otto Granström (1887–1941), Finnish gymnast who competed in the 1908 Summer Olympics
Per Erik Granström (1942–2011), Swedish politician